The Market Place (also known as the Tustin Market Place or the Tustin/Irvine Market Place) is an outdoor shopping center located in Orange County, California. Opened in 1988, the center is located along Jamboree Road and Interstate 5, straddling the borders of Irvine and Tustin. The Market Place features 140 tenants including Athleta, Amazon Fresh, Lazy Dog Restaurant & Bar, Nordstrom Rack, REI, Sephora and Texas de Brazil. The property is owned and managed by The Irvine Company.

Design
The center is also unique in that all the store signs are displayed in neon. The overall design operates on the idea that center's tenants add most of the color and character to the otherwise plain center, a concept that had previously (though unsuccessfully) been attempted with Britain's Tricorn Centre. The buildings are arranged in a ring around a large central series of parking lots and fast-food restaurants. The center on the whole has a "desert" look to it, with parking lots shaded under groves of date palms, and extensive rock landscaping around the perimeter of the center. The buildings themselves are uniformly surfaced in bright orange, purple, and pink stucco.

History

Phase 1
Construction of Phase I began in 1988 on the Tustin (northwest) side of Jamboree Road, and this phase was opened in three distinct sections. (now PetSmart).

Phase 2
In 1996, Phase II of the Tustin Market Place opened on the Irvine (southeast) side of Jamboree Road.

Phase 3
Phase III, also on the Irvine (southeast) side of Jamboree Road, opened in 1999. Another  of retail space were added to the Market Place in this phase, which included a new Lowe's store (closed 2019, now Mathis Brothers Furniture), a large food court, and a Target store.

Later Additions
The newer 10-screen Edwards Theater, which opened as part of Phase 2, operated alongside the original 6-screen theater built in Phase 1, which was also operated by Edwards, until 2012 when the older six-screen theater closed, due to more people going to the newer theater across the street as well as the new AMC Tustin 14 at the District at Tustin Legacy. A community center operated by the City of Tustin opened in 2014 in the space originally occupied by the six-screen theater.

In Spring 2014, three new restaurants were added in close proximity to the existing Best Buy store. A Chase Bank branch and a Food Court were also added close to the existing Lowe's store.

The Market Place added a Starbucks, with a drive through, and an Urban Plates restaurant near the former Lowe's building in late 2015. A new building was added close to the theater to accommodate the two new restaurants.

The former Babies R Us space was renovated to hold one of the first Amazon Fresh stores, a new grocery store concept by Amazon, which opened in October 2020.

Incidents
On December 27, 2020, an Asian woman was attacked at The Market Place after she asked a man to maintain social distance due to COVID-19 concerns. The man, identified online as Brian Kranz, reportedly threatened to punch the woman. Kranz was later filmed by the woman in a Market Place parking lot telling the woman to "go back to China" along with a derogatory term, jumping out of his car to chase the woman into hers, and saying "thanks for giving my country COVID". District congresswoman Katie Porter denounced the attack and Tustin police investigated the incident. The incident was one of several racist attacks related to COVID-19.

References

External links
Official website

Shopping malls in Orange County, California
Tustin, California
Shopping malls established in 1988
1988 establishments in California
Ricardo Legorreta buildings
Postmodern architecture in California